Kannauj district is an administrative district of Uttar Pradesh state in northern India, along the river Ganges. The historic town of Kannauj, northwest of Kanpur, is the administrative center. The district was carved out of Farrukhabad district on 18 September 1997. The native dialect of this district is Kannauji.

Geography 

It has an average elevation of 139 metres (456 feet).

The Ganges is the main river of the district at the North East border of the district. Kali river is at the northern border of the district while the Ishan river flows through the District.

The climate of the district is characterized by a hot dry summer and a pleasant cold season. The average rainfall of the District is approximately 80 cm.

The district is bounded by the districts of Farrukhabad to the north, Hardoi to the northeast, Kanpur Nagar to the east, Kanpur Dehat to the southeast, Auraiya to the south, Etawah to the southwest, and Mainpuri to the west. The district is divided into three tehsils and eight development blocks. The district was split from Farrukhabad on 18 September 1997, and is part of Kanpur Division.

Demographics 

According to the 2011 census Kannauj district has a population of 1,656,616, roughly equal to the nation of Guinea-Bissau or the US state of Idaho. This gives it a ranking of 299th in India (out of a total of 640). Its population growth rate over the decade 2001–2011 was 19.37%. Kannauj has a sex ratio of 879 females for every 1000 males, and a literacy rate of 74.01%. Scheduled Castes made up 18.71% of the population.

At the time of the 2011 Census of India, 96.62% of the population in the district spoke Hindi (or a related language) and 2.89% Urdu as their first language.

The District's population was 1,388,923 in 2001. Of these, 1,156,951 (or 83.3%) lived in rural areas, while 231,972 (or 16.7%) lived in urban areas.

Historical and Spiritual importance 
There are many temples in Kannauj which are very important by both Historical as well as spiritual purposes. In the time of King Harsha it was the kingdom of India.

It is very much famous for Kannauj Perfume also. That is the reason why it is mentioned as the city of perfumes.

Colleges

Medical College
Government Medical College, Kannauj is a government medical college located in Tirwa of Kannauj. It is affiliated to King George's Medical University, Lucknow. In 2012, the institute become recognized for 100 M.B.B.S. seats by Medical Council of India (MCI).

Engineering College
Government Engineering College, Kannauj is a government engineering college in Kannauj. It is a constituent college of Dr. A.P.J. Abdul Kalam Technical University (formerly Uttar Pradesh Technical University) in Lucknow, and has its temporary campus at Harcourt Butler Technical University in Kanpur.

Nearby cities
 Etawah
 Kanpur
 Farrukhabad

References

External links 

 

 
Districts of Uttar Pradesh